The communauté de communes des Vallées vertes du Cher Ouest was located in the Cher  département  of the Centre-Val de Loire region of France. It was created in January 1994. It was merged into the new Communauté de communes Vierzon-Sologne-Berry in January 2013.

Member communes 
It comprised the following 7 communes:

Dampierre-en-Graçay 
Genouilly
Graçay
Nohant-en-Graçay 
Saint-Georges-sur-la-Prée
Saint-Hilaire-de-Court
Saint-Outrille

References 

Vallees vertes du Cher Ouest